The Finnish Socialist Workers' Republic (FSWR), more commonly referred to as Red Finland, was a self-proclaimed Finnish socialist state that ruled parts of the country during the Finnish Civil War of 1918. It was outlined on 29 January 1918 by the Finnish People's Delegation, the Reds and Red Guards of the Finnish Social Democratic Party, after the socialist revolution in Finland on 26 January 1918. Its sole prime minister was Kullervo Manner, chairman of the central committee.

The name "Finnish Socialist Workers' Republic" appeared only in the Treaty between Finnish People's Delegation and Russian Council of People's Commissars, signed on 1 March 1918. The People's Delegation had earlier used the name Republic of Finland, but Soviet leader V. I. Lenin proposed adding the attributes "Socialist Workers' Republic" into the name during negotiations. The People's Delegation later blamed its delegates for succumbing to Lenin's demand, since the official name of the state should have been decided by the Finns themselves.

Aims
Red Finland/FSWR was an attempt to establish a socialist nation, based on the legacy of Scandinavian-Finnish culture, socialist ideas originating from Central Europe and Finnish nationalism, including plans to expand the Finnish territory. Their political visions included principles of democracy, but as Red Finland was primarily the formation of revolution and civil war, the acts of violence and warfare were emphasized in the policy. The Red Guards included a minor faction of Finnish Bolsheviks who supported association of FSWR to Soviet Russia. FSWR/Red Finland never gained a true status and form of state and republic as the Reds lost the Civil War on 5 May 1918.

Geographical area
The geographical area of Red Finland as well as the front line between White and Red Finland took shape approximately between 28 January and 3 February 1918, and it remained largely unchanged until the general offensive of the Whites in March 1918.

Draft constitution
The Finnish People's Delegation, mainly Otto Ville Kuusinen, formulated and set forth, on 23 February 1918, a draft for a constitution of Red Finland/FSWR, on the basis of the Finnish Social Democratic principles and mentality. The Marxist concept of dictatorship of the proletariat was absent from the program. Instead, it represented an idea of democratic socialism and it was influenced by the constitutions of Switzerland and United States, and French Revolution. The constitution model included most of democratic civil rights for the Finnish citizens, including an extensive use of referendum in political decision making, but private property rights were excluded and given to state and local administration. The draft was never finally formulated and approved in Red Finland, before the defeat of FSWR in the 1918 war.

The political situation after the January Revolution in Finland raised a major question in terms of the constitution draft, among the Finnish (moderate) socialists. The question arose if the power gained via revolution would allow democracy a true chance in Finnish society.

Relations with Lenin
Although the Finnish Socialist Worker's Republic was supported by the Russian Soviet Federative Socialist Republic (RSFSR), led by Vladimir Lenin, and the 1 March 1918 Red Treaty was signed between these two unstable socialist states, an ideal level of co-operation and co-ordination was never achieved, due to both states being preoccupied with their own respective civil wars. The goal of the Finnish Reds' majority was a neutral and independent Finland, and some of them demanded annexation of Aunus, Viena Karelia and Petsamo areas of Russian Karelia to Finland. The Russian-Finnish Red treaty had only minor importance for the Bolsheviks as they carried out peace negotiations with the German Empire. In the end, the fate of the Finnish Reds and FSWR was determined through the power political decisions made between Russia and Germany.

Lenin aimed to halt a complete collapse of Russia after the revolutionary year 1917. While in political opposition prior to the October Revolution, Lenin emphasized the policy of nations' right to self-determination for the former parts of the Russian Empire. After the successful seizure of power in October 1917 and in January 1918, the Bolsheviks' power political strategy shifted gradually toward federalism. As for Finland, Lenin plotted its annexation by Russia, but the Russian Civil War, German-Russian Treaty of Brest-Litovsk, Finland-operation of the German Army, the victory of the White Guards in the Finnish civil war and the marked nationalism among the Finnish socialists stalled his plan.

Civil war

After the start of the Finnish Civil War, on January 28, 1918, Kullervo Manner was appointed chairman of the People's Delegation, the Red Government. On April 10 of the same year, the Reds reformed their entire administration and Manner was appointed leader of the Red Finland and the Supreme Commander of the Red Guard under the authority of the dictator.

The warfare between the Reds and Whites took major attention and energy of the Red leadership, and the situation was not alleviated by the loss of many strategically important sites, such as Tampere, to the Whites. Therefore, the formation of the local Red civil administration remained unfinished and waited for the result of the Civil War. The top and middle-rank civil servants of the pre-civil war administration refused to co-operate with the Reds, and new leadership had to be chosen and trained from the lower rank servants.

Defeat of the FSWR
The Finnish Civil War ended with the German invasion of Finland and the consequent defeat of the Finnish Red Guards and FSWR on 5 May 1918. After the war, the initially powerful and well-organized Finnish Social Democrats, born and bred in the relatively free and nationalistic social atmosphere, within the Scandinavian and Russian culture, and affected primarily by socialist ideas of Germany, Austria and Czechoslovakia (pre-World War I Austria-Hungary), were split in two. The moderate socialists continued their pre-1918 political culture, adhered to the society and political system of Finland, while the far-left faction formed the Communist Party of Finland in August 1918 in Moscow, with the main leaders living in exile in Russia and a marked part of the common supporters living in Finland.

See also

 Eero Haapalainen
 Republic of Finland
 Finnish Democratic Republic — short-lived Soviet puppet government during World War II
 Karelo-Finnish Soviet Socialist Republic
 Kingdom of Finland (1918)
 Kullervo Manner
 Otto Wille Kuusinen
 Revolutions of 1917–23
 Santeri Nuorteva

References
Notes

Bibliography
 .
 .
 .
 .
 .
 .
 .
 .
 .
 .
 .
 .
 .
 .
 .
 .
 .

External links
Treaty of Friendship with the Finnish Socialist Workers’ Republic, a Russian-Finnish treaty.
Treaty with the Finnish Socialist Workers’ Republic, Lenin's writings on the matter.

1918 disestablishments in Finland
Communism in Finland
Finnish Civil War
Former socialist republics
Post–Russian Empire states
States and territories established in 1918
States and territories disestablished in 1918
Former unrecognized countries
1918 establishments in Finland
Finnish Socialist Workers' Republic